Antaeotricha reciprocella is a moth in the family Depressariidae. It was described by Francis Walker in 1864. It is found in Pará, Brazil and in the Guianas.

Adults are shining white, the forewings for nearly one-fourth of the surface from the base blackish, this hue more extended along the interior border than along the costa. There are some indications of two transverse cinereous (ash gray) lines and there is a black point in the exterior disk, nearly contiguous to a cinereous patch which rests on the interior angle. The hindwings are aeneous (bronze) cinereous.

References

Moths described in 1864
reciprocella
Moths of South America